Gdynia Chylonia railway station is a railway station serving the city of Gdynia, in the Pomeranian Voivodeship, Poland. The station opened in 1870 and is located in the Chylonia district on the Gdańsk–Stargard railway and the parallel Gdańsk Śródmieście–Rumia railway. The train services are operated by Przewozy Regionalne and SKM Tricity.

There is a memorial plaque to Polish General Antoni Heda at the station.

Modernisation
The platforms used by PR services were modernised in 2014.

Train services
The station is served by the following services:

Regional services (R) Tczew — Gdynia Chylonia 
Regional services (R) Tczew — Słupsk  
Regional services (R) Malbork — Słupsk  
Regional services (R) Malbork — Gdynia Chylonia 
Regional services (R) Elbląg — Gdynia Chylonia 
Regional services (R) Elbląg — Słupsk  
Regional services (R) Gdynia Chylonia — Olsztyn Główny
Regional services (R) Gdynia Chylonia — Smętowo 
Regional services (R) Gdynia Chylonia — Laskowice Pomorskie 
Regional services (R) Gdynia Chylonia — Bydgoszcz Główna 
Regional services (R) Słupsk — Bydgoszcz Główna 
Regional services (R) Gdynia Chylonia — Pruszcz Gdański 
Regional services (R) Władysławowo - Reda - Gdynia Główna
Regional services (R) Hel - Władysławowo - Reda - Gdynia Główna
Regional services (R) Luzino — Gdynia Główna
Regional services (R) Słupsk — Gdynia Główna
Pomorska Kolej Metropolitalna services (R) Gdynia Główna — Gdańsk Osowa — Gdańsk Port Lotniczy (Airport) — Gdańsk Wrzeszcz
Szybka Kolej Miejska services (SKM) (Lębork -) Wejherowo - Reda - Rumia - Gdynia - Sopot - Gdansk

References 

 This article is based upon a translation of the Polish language version as of August 2016.

External links

Railway stations in Poland opened in 1870
Railway stations served by Szybka Kolej Miejska (Tricity)
Railway stations served by Przewozy Regionalne InterRegio
Chylonia